The 2015 Slovak Open is a professional tennis tournament played on indoor hard courts in Bratislava, Slovakia. The men’s singles has been a staple of the open since its inception in 2000. Egor Gerasimov won the title, defeating Lukáš Lacko in the final 7–6(7–1), 7–6(7–5) . Egor was awarded €12,250 for winning the tournament.

Seeds

Draw

Finals

Top half

Bottom half

References

 Main Draw
 Qualifying Draw

Slovak Open - Singles
2015 Singles